Ian Keith Affleck is a Canadian physicist specializing in condensed matter physics. He is (in 2013) Killam University Professor, Department of Physics and Astronomy, University of British Columbia.

Work
Ian Affleck currently studies theoretical aspects of condensed matter physics, including high temperature superconductivity, low dimensional magnetism, quantum dots and quantum wires.

Ian Affleck has made many important contributions to theoretical and mathematical physics. He began his career in high energy theory (HEP), and has successfully applied many techniques from HEP to condensed matter. In particular, he has applied conformal field theory techniques to low dimensional magnetism, Kondo effects and quantum impurity problems. In doing so, he enjoys finding "mathematically elegant solutions" to problems.
He is also a member of the CIFAR's Superconductivity Program and the Cosmology and Gravity Program.

Affleck holds numerous awards including the 2006 CAP Medal for Lifetime Achievement and the 2014 DCMMP Brockhouse Medal.
He was elected a  Fellow of the American Physical Society in 2002  and a Fellow of the Royal Society in 2010.

References 

1952 births
Living people
Scientists from Vancouver
Academic staff of the University of British Columbia Faculty of Science
Sloan Research Fellows
Fellows of the American Physical Society
Fellows of the Royal Society of Canada
Canadian physicists
Trent University alumni
Harvard Graduate School of Arts and Sciences alumni
Canadian Fellows of the Royal Society